The Hazel Avenue/Prospect Avenue Historic District is a historic area of Highland Park, Illinois, United States. It was home to some of Highland Park's most notable residents, including telephone inventor Elisha Gray.

History
The historic district in Highland Park, Illinois reflects the period in the early 20th century when the town was recognized as a resort community. Included in the district is the Wildwood complex, a set of four summer houses on Hazel Avenue near Linden Avenue that shared a common dining room. Year-round residences were also constructed in the district at the time, some from notable architects. Howard Van Doren Shaw designed a Colonial Revival dwelling at 289 Prospect. Oral tradition also associates Shaw with the houses at 178 Prospect, 203 Prospect, and 215 Prospect. The district was recognized by the National Park Service with a listing on the National Register of Historic Places on September 29, 1982.

Buildings
The district was home to Elisha Gray, who is known for filing a patent for a telephone on the same day as Alexander Graham Bell. Gray's telephone was invented in 1874 in a small cottage at 333 Hazel Avenue. He lived in a house at 461 Hazel. William D. Mann designed a house for Elias Watkins at 239 Hazel. The house was later home to Edith Neisser, an author on child-rearing. Henry C. Lytton, chairman of Lytton's Department Store, commissioned a southern-style house at 276 Hazel. One of the four houses of Wilwood was owned by Oscar Foreman, who commissioned Jens Jensen to landscape the yard. A cabin that Jensen designed for the property was later moved and became part of the Heller Nature Center elsewhere in Highland Park.

Highland Park City Hall and the Highland Park Public Library are also found in the district. An 1847 log cabin originally owned by Franz Stuppi, is now park of a public museum. The lone church in the district is the First Church of Christian Science, built in 1941.

References

National Register of Historic Places in Lake County, Illinois
Victorian architecture in Illinois
Historic districts on the National Register of Historic Places in Illinois
Highland Park, Illinois
Houses on the National Register of Historic Places in Illinois
Houses in Lake County, Illinois